Women's rugby league is the female-only version of Rugby league. There are women's clubs in Australia, Great Britain, and New Zealand, overseen internationally by the Women & Girls Rugby League.

Australia, France, England and New Zealand compete on a regular basis with a Women's Rugby League World Cup being established in 2000.

Governing Bodies

Women's & Girls Rugby League 
The Women & Girls Rugby League is the international governing body of women's rugby league and was established in 2000 in conjunction with the first Women's Rugby League World Cup.

The organisation currently oversees the running of the international game for women's rugby league and helps organize rugby league domestically in several countries.

Australian Women's Rugby League 

The Australian Women's Rugby League is the governing body of female rugby league in Australia and other parts of Oceania and was established in 1993. It currently falls under the Australian Rugby League which oversees its running and management but it took the association five years to be recognized by the ARL.

The AWRL is run at state level by its own governing organisations in the Queensland Women's Rugby League, New South Wales Women's Rugby League, Canberra Women's Rugby League and the Western Australian Women's Rugby League. The main women's competitions in Australia are the National Rugby League Women's Premiership, Sydney Metropolitan Women's Rugby League and the Brisbane and District Women's Rugby League.

At international level the Australian Women's side is commonly referred to as the Australian Jillaroos.

Rugby Football League 
The RFL Women's Rugby League is the governing body of female rugby league in the United Kingdom; although some activity is run by the independent Women's Amateur Rugby League Association, originally established in 1985. With summer rugby becoming increasingly popular, the appeal of WARLA has waned, with the RFL running the largest women's rugby league competition in the world.

At the beginning of the 2006 season there were between thirty and forty female only rugby league clubs running in England not including clubs that have teams of both sexes. The majority of these clubs are located in Lancashire and Yorkshire.

The RFL Women's Rugby League is a competition for female rugby league teams. The Women's Super League began in 2017 as the elite women's rugby league competition in the United Kingdom.

At international level the Women's England side is commonly referred to as the Great Britain Lionesses In 2006, the RFL announced that after the 2007 All Golds Tour the Great Britain team would no longer compete on a regular basis, and that players would be able to represent England, Wales and Scotland at Test level. It is planned that the Great Britain team will come together in future only for occasional tours.

New Zealand Rugby League 
Women's rugby league in New Zealand is controlled by the New Zealand Rugby League. The national side is called the Kiwi Ferns. The NZRL Women's National Tournament is a competition for female rugby league teams. Women have been playing rugby in New Zealand since the 19th century.

Australian active competitions 
Each state has their own games and competitions.

One of the most anticipated games on a national level is the State of Origin. This series is played by Queensland and New South Wales. The series only consists of three matches. Each match is played at a different ground, including the ANZ Stadium in Sydney and the Suncorp Stadium in Brisbane. The team who wins two of the three games wins the State of Origin cup.

International 
The following list of nations that compete, or have competed, internationally in women's rugby league. Table last updated: 21 November 2022.

Notes:
 In the Venues columns H: Home, A: Away, N: Neutral.
 The tally of For and Against points for England and France excludes one Test Match, their first meeting in 2007.
 A Great Britain women's rugby league team toured France in 1989 but played only touch football games against French women. They did play a tackle match against a men's Under 21 team, losing 4–10.
 The 2000 World Cup programme lists previous Test series occurring between 1995 and 1999.
 An article previewing the 2007 match between England and France mentions that it was the first international to be played by an English or Great Britain side since the 2003 World Cup.
  Jamaica played in a Nines tournament in 2019 (with Canada and Ontario teams), but is yet to play in a full international.

The following played tour, nines or other international matches prior to making a Test or World Cup debut.

Women's Rugby League World Cup 

The Women's Rugby League World Cup was first held in Great Britain during 2000 to coincide with men's Rugby League World Cup with Australia, Great Britain and eventual winners New Zealand competing. New Zealand also won the second and third World Cups: a nine team tournament held at North Harbour Stadium, in the Auckland suburb of Albany in 2003; and an eight team tournament held at the Sunshine Coast Stadium and, for the final, Suncorp Stadium in 2008.

In the 2013 World Cup, the Australian Jillaroos won the cup, breaking New Zealand's 13 year winning streak. Australia again beat New Zealand in the 2017 World Cup Final.

The World Cup is played every 4 years. Delayed by a year due to the COVID-19 pandemic, the most recent World Cup included eight teams and was held in November 2022 in England. It was played alongside Men's and Wheelchair tournaments. Australia won the tournament for the third time, all three in succession.

The next World Cup will be played in France in 2025 with sixteen participating teams, and be held alongside Men's, Wheelchair and a Youth World Cup.

See also 

 Women's Rugby World Cup
 Women's rugby union
 Women's sports

References

External links 
 Women's NRL

 
Variations of rugby league
Rugby League pages needing cleanup